Fisher Branch may refer to:

Fisher Branch, Manitoba, an unincorporated community
Fisher Branch (Reddish Branch), a stream in Missouri